Laura Nicholls González (born 26 February 1989) is a Spanish basketball player who plays for Casademont Zaragoza of La Liga Feminina. She is a regular member of the Spain women's national basketball team since 2008, having won eight medals in final tournaments.

Club career
She started playing as a child in Cantabria before moving to Catalonia as a junior in 2004 to play at Segle XXI, a club which works in lower division developing young prospects. Her first club in the top tier of the Spanish League was Celta Vigourbán in 2007, at 18 years of age. For good performance in the season she received her first call-up with the Spanish senior team for the 2008 Olympics in Beijing. The following year she transferred to Hondarribia-Irún for one just season before signing with Rivas Ecópoolis, where she played from 2010–11 to 2013–14, winning one Spanish League in 2014 and two Spanish Cups in 2011 and 2013, and playing for four seasons in the EuroLeague Women, reaching the final in the 2011–12 EuroLeague edition.

She played the next three seasons in three different countries: Kayseri Kaski S.K. from Turkey, Wisła Kraków from Poland (winning the Polish League) and Virtus Eirene Ragusa from Italy. She went back to Spain to play for CB Perfumerías Avenida in 2017. She signed for Russian team Nadezhda Orenburg for the 2018-19 season, winning the 2018-19 EuroCup Women. In 2019, she signed for Turkish team Fenerbahçe Öznur Kablo. In 2020, she signed with Casademont Zaragoza of La Liga Feminina.

European cups statistics

National team
In the Spanish youth teams since she was 15, she won medals in tournaments of all age groups (U-16, U-18, U-20).

She made her debut with the Spanish senior team at 19, and has been in all tournaments that the team has played. She is one of the most capped players with a total of 157  caps and 4.9 PPG. She participated in two Olympic Games, two World Championships and in six European Championships:
  2004 FIBA Europe Under-16 Championship (youth)
  2005 FIBA Europe Under-16 Championship (youth)
  2006 FIBA Europe Under-18 Championship (youth)
  2007 FIBA Europe Under-18 Championship (youth)
 4th 2007 FIBA Under-19 World Championship (youth)
  2009 FIBA Europe Under-20 Championship (youth)
 5th 2008 Summer Olympics
  2009 Eurobasket
  2010 World Championship
 9th 2011 Eurobasket
  2013 Eurobasket
  2014 World Championship
  2015 Eurobasket
  2016 Summer Olympics
  2017 Eurobasket
  2018 World Championship
  2019 Eurobasket

Personal life
Nicholls is of Curaçaoan descent through her paternal grandfather.

References

External links
 
 
 
 
 
 

1989 births
Living people
Abdullah Gül Üniversitesi basketball players
Basketball players at the 2008 Summer Olympics
Basketball players at the 2016 Summer Olympics
Basketball players from Cantabria
Fenerbahçe women's basketball players
Olympic basketball players of Spain
Spanish women's basketball players
Spanish women's 3x3 basketball players
Sportspeople from Santander, Spain
Spanish expatriate basketball people in Italy
Spanish expatriate basketball people in Turkey
Medalists at the 2016 Summer Olympics
Olympic silver medalists for Spain
Olympic medalists in basketball
Power forwards (basketball)
Centers (basketball)
Spanish expatriate basketball people in Poland
Spanish people of Curaçao descent
Lesbian sportswomen
LGBT basketball players
Spanish LGBT sportspeople